Aanand Vardhan is a Telugu film actor who, as a child artiste, appeared in more than 20 Telugu films.

Family
He is the grandson of the famous playback singer P. B. Srinivas. His father is a chartered accountant. His father used to frequently tell him stories from Ramayana, so he learnt them by heart, and later had a role in Ramayanam. His grandfather also wanted to see him as an actor.

Career
He was 4 years old when he acted in the film Ramayanam. He played the roles of Valmiki and Hanuman.

He made his feature film debut as a child actor in Priyaragalu starring Jagapathi Babu and Soundarya. He played significant roles in the hit films  Suryavamsam, Preminchukundam Raa and Manasantha Nuvve.

He acted with Jagapati Babu, Venkatesh and  Nandamuri Balakrishna. He also acted with Amitabh Bachchan in the Hindi remake of Suryavamsam.

He graduated with Bachelor of Technology degree in Computer Science & Engineering from CMR College of Engineering & Technology, Hyderabad, Telangana, India in 2012.

Filmography

Awards
1997: Nandi Award for Best Child Actor - Priyaragalu

References

Living people
Telugu male actors
Indian male film actors
Indian male child actors
Male actors in Telugu cinema
Male actors in Hindi cinema
Nandi Award winners
Year of birth missing (living people)
20th-century Indian male actors
21st-century Indian male actors